The 1963 Cleveland Indians season was a season in American baseball. The team finished tied for fifth in the American League with a record of 79–83, 25½ games behind the New York Yankees.

Offseason 
 November 26, 1962: Lou Piniella was drafted from the Indians by the Washington Senators in the 1962 first-year draft.
 November 26, 1962: Bob Lipski was drafted by the Indians from the Philadelphia Phillies in the 1962 rule 5 draft.
 March 1963: Rubén Gómez was signed as a free agent by the Indians.
 Prior to 1963 season: Duke Carmel was acquired from the Indians by the St. Louis Cardinals.

Regular season

Season standings

Record vs. opponents

Notable transactions 
 April 2, 1963: Ellis Burton was purchased by the Indians from the Houston Colt .45s.
 May 8, 1963: Bob Lipski was returned by the Indians to the Philadelphia Phillies.
 May 25, 1963: Doc Edwards and $100,000 were traded by the Indians to the Kansas City Athletics for Joe Azcue and Dick Howser.
 May 27, 1963: Ellis Burton was purchased from the Indians by the Chicago Cubs.

Opening Day Lineup

Roster

Player stats

Batting

Starters by position 
Note: Pos = Position; G = Games played; AB = At bats; H = Hits; Avg. = Batting average; HR = Home runs; RBI = Runs batted in

Other batters 
Note: G = Games played; AB = At bats; H = Hits; Avg. = Batting average; HR = Home runs; RBI = Runs batted in

Pitching

Starting pitchers 
Note: G = Games pitched; IP = Innings pitched; W = Wins; L = Losses; ERA = Earned run average; SO = Strikeouts

Other pitchers 
Note: G = Games pitched; IP = Innings pitched; W = Wins; L = Losses; ERA = Earned run average; SO = Strikeouts

Relief pitchers 
Note: G = Games pitched; W = Wins; L = Losses; SV = Saves; ERA = Earned run average; SO = Strikeouts

Awards and honors 
All-Star Game
Mudcat Grant, reserve

Farm system 

LEAGUE CHAMPIONS: Charleston, Grand Forks

References

External links 
1963 Cleveland Indians season at Baseball Reference

Cleveland Guardians seasons
Cleveland Indians season
Cleveland